Goodenia glabra, commonly known as shiny pansy or smooth goodenia, is a species of flowering plant in the family Goodeniaceae and is endemic to drier inland areas of Australia. It is a prostrate to low-lying herb with lobed, oblong to egg-shaped leaves, and racemes of yellow flowers with purplish markings.

Description

Taxonomy and naming
Goodenia glabra was first formally described in 1810 Robert Brown in his Prodromus Florae Novae Hollandiae et Insulae Van Diemen. The specific epithet (glabra) means "without hair".

Distribution and habitat
Goodenia glabra grows in the drier inland parts of Western Australia, South Australia, the Northern Territory, Queensland and New South Wales.

References

glabra
Flora of South Australia
Eudicots of Western Australia
Flora of the Northern Territory
Flora of Queensland
Flora of New South Wales
Plants described in 1810
Taxa named by Robert Brown (botanist, born 1773)
Endemic flora of Australia